Jing Prefecture may refer to:
 Jingzhou (historical prefecture in Shaanxi), a historical prefecture in modern Shaanxi, China during the 10th century
 Jingzhou (historical prefecture in Gansu), a historical prefecture in modern Gansu, China between the 5th and 20th centuries

See also
Jing (disambiguation)
Jingzhou (disambiguation)